Gilbert Bessi (born 9 July 1958) is a Monegasque bobsledder and sprinter. He competed in the bobsleigh at four editions of the Winter Olympics between 1988 and 1998. He also competed in the men's 100 metres at the 1988 Summer Olympics.

See also
 List of athletes who competed in both the Summer and Winter Olympic games

References

1958 births
Living people
Athletes (track and field) at the 1988 Summer Olympics
Bobsledders at the 1988 Winter Olympics
Bobsledders at the 1992 Winter Olympics
Bobsledders at the 1994 Winter Olympics
Bobsledders at the 1998 Winter Olympics
Monegasque male sprinters
Monegasque male bobsledders
Olympic athletes of Monaco
Olympic bobsledders of Monaco
World Athletics Championships athletes for Monaco
Place of birth missing (living people)